Vincent Selva is an Indian film director and screenwriter associated with the Tamil film industry. This director is best known for his debut flick, Priyamudan starring Vijay, Kausalya. Other directors such as Mysskin and S. P. Jananathan worked under him.

Career

Vincent Selva got associated with film scene in the 1990s.

He made his film debut as a director through the film Priyamudan. The romantic film released in 1998 was a major hit at box office and had been remade to Telugu, Kannada and Hindi. This is the first movie where Vijay played an anti-hero role.

In 1999 he released his second film, Iraniyan, a fictional biography of freedom fighter "Vattakudi Iraniyan". The movie starred Murali and Meena and opened to mixed reviews.
 
In 2002 he directed Youth a film starring Vijay, which was well received by critics and audiences. The movie starred the Fair & Lovely girl, Shaheen Khan in the lead role. In 2002, he was signed on by producer Keyaar to make a film titled Enna Peyar Veikalaam featuring Karthik in the lead role. Despite travelling to Pollachi for the shoot, the actor refused to emerge from his hotel room, and following an extended period of confusion, the film was called off.

He worked on Khakee, a  police thriller with Sarathkumar in the lead role during 2006, but the film was shelved. Despite attempts to restart the venture in 2008, the film did not finish production.

In 2005 he remade the Bollywood film, Gayab to Tamil titled, Jithan. The movie met with commercial success. After the film, he directed the same actor Jithan Ramesh in Madurai Veeran, but it was received negative reviews. Perumal, Thulli Vilayadu and Inga Enna Solluthu are other releases.

In 2016, he made a comeback with the sequel of Jithan and the movie titled Jithan 2 was a major setback. The talented and multiaward winning director Mysskin known for his off beat movies worked as an assistant under him. S. P. Jananathan has also worked under him as an assistant.

Filmography

References 

Year of birth missing (living people)
Tamil-language film directors
Living people
Film directors from Tamil Nadu